This is a list of rulers of the Ngoni dynasty.

Jere, (Qeko), (Malawi) and (Tanzania)
Jere Dynasty (Qeko dynasty) (Ngoni Dynasty)
{|
Term
Incumbent
Notes 
|-
|colspan="2"|Inkosi ya makosi (Paramount Chief)
|-
|1840 to 1848||Zwangendaba a Hlatshwayo, Inkosi ya makosi
|-
|1848 to 1850||Ntabeni, Regent
|-
|1850 to 1854||Mgayi, Regent
|-
|1854 to 1857||Gwaza Jere, Regent
|-
|1857 to 1891||Mmbelwa I, Inkosi ya makosi
|-
|1891 to 1896||Mwamba, Regent
|-
|1896 to 1915||Cimtunga, Inkosi ya makosi
|-
|1915 to 1928||Interregnum
|-
|1928 to 1959||Mmbelwa II, Inkosi ya makosi
|-
|1958 to 1984||Mmbelwa III, Inkosi ya makosi
|-
|1984 to 2013 ||Mmbelwa IV, Inkosi ya makosi
|-
|2014 to 2017||Mperella I, Inkosi ya makosi
|-
|2017 to present||Mperella II, Inkosi ya makosi
|-
|}

Malawi history-related lists
Tanzania history-related lists